Jointed rush is a common name for several plants in the genus Juncus and may refer to:

Juncus articulatus, native to the Northern hemisphere, commonly known as "jointed rush" in the United Kingdom
Juncus kraussii, native to the Southern hemisphere, commonly known as "jointed rush" in Australia
Baumea articulata, native to the Southern hemisphere, commonly known as "jointed rush" in Australia